Official Formula 1 Racing is a racing game developed by Lankhor and published by Eidos Interactive in 1999. A sequel to the game, called F1 World Grand Prix (the 1999 version), was released in 1999–2000.

Reception

The game received average reviews according to the review aggregation website GameRankings. GameSpot said that Official Formula 1 Racing achieved a success either as an arcade racer or as a serious simulation. CNET Gamecenter gave it an unfavorable review almost a month before its release date. Adam Pavlacka of NextGen gave the positive review, but considered the title as not groundbreaking or exciting.

References

External links
 

1999 video games
Cancelled PlayStation (console) games
Eidos Interactive games
Formula One video games
Lankhor games
Racing video games
Video games developed in France
Windows games
Windows-only games